"Paint Your Target" is a song by English post-hardcore band Fightstar. It was released on 13 June 2005 as the lead single from their debut studio album, Grand Unification (2006). It charted at number nine in the United Kingdom. To 'paint your target' is a military expression which refers to identifying and marking a target so that it can be attacked by other forces.

There are also two recorded versions of "Paint Your Target". One, recorded by Chris Sheldon, was released as a single and appeared on both of the music videos. The other, recorded by Colin Richardson, appears on Grand Unification.

Music video
There are two videos for this song, one was banned because of scenes of children running around pretending to shoot each other, however this can still be found on the internet on sites such as YouTube and the second version with the band in a room playing the song. The room in the second version is similar to the one used in Feeders "Find the Colour" video. In the banned video, children are simply shown playing at soldiers with CGI muzzle flashes and missiles. Near the end of the song, a girl is nearly hit by a rocket and led away by a disapproving teacher. At the end, the pupils head back inside, although one stays outside briefly; his irises briefly take the shape of a mushroom cloud. The video can be interpreted as an ironic comment on how war and fighting are sanitised in mainstream culture.

Track listings

Charts

References

2005 singles
2005 songs
Fightstar songs
Island Records singles
Songs written by Alex Westaway
Songs written by Charlie Simpson